The Roman Catholic Diocese of Wuchang is a diocese located in the Wuchang District of Wuhan (Hubei) in the Ecclesiastical province of Hankou in China.

History
 December 12, 1923: Established as Apostolic Prefecture of Wuchang 武昌
 May 31, 1930: Promoted as Apostolic Vicariate of Wuchang 武昌
 April 11, 1946: Promoted as Diocese of Wuchang 武昌

Leadership
 Bishops of Wuchang 武昌 (Roman rite)
 Bishop Rombert Casimir Kowalski, O.F.M. (April 11, 1946 – November 27, 1970)
 Vicars Apostolic of Wuchang 武昌 (Roman Rite)
 Bishop Rombert Casimir Kowalski, O.F.M. (November 24, 1941 – April 11, 1946)
 Bishop Sylvester Joseph Espelage, O.F.M. (July 17, 1925 – October 25, 1940)

References

 GCatholic.org
 Catholic Hierarchy

Roman Catholic dioceses in China
Christian organizations established in 1923
Roman Catholic dioceses and prelatures established in the 20th century
Religion in Hubei
Organizations based in Wuhan